The 151st Street station was a local station on the demolished IRT Ninth Avenue Line in Manhattan, New York City. It had 2 levels. The lower level had two tracks and two side platforms and served local trains. The station was built as part of the Dual Contracts and had one track that served express trains that bypassed this station. The next stop to the north was 155th Street. The next stop to the south was 145th Street. The station opened on November 15, 1917 and closed on June 11, 1940.

References

External links 
NYCsubway.org - The IRT Ninth Avenue Elevated Line-Polo Grounds Shuttle

IRT Ninth Avenue Line stations
Railway stations in the United States opened in 1917
Railway stations closed in 1940
Former elevated and subway stations in Manhattan
1917 establishments in New York City
1940 disestablishments in New York (state)